Ashaghy caravanserai or Lower Caravanserai is a historical monument of the 17th century located in Azerbaijan, in the city of Sheki.

The caravanserai is placed on a difficult terrain (the fast-flowing river Gurjanachay flows next to the caravanserai) and has the shape of a trapezoid. The total area of the building is about 8000 m2. It has a capacity of about 242 rooms.

The caravanserai has entrance gates on four sides. When the gates were closed, the caravanserai turned into an inaccessible fortress. The Ashaghy Caravanserai, like the Upper Caravanserai, has preserved the traits inherent in the caravanserais of the East. 

The Lower and the Upper caravanserais, were built by local craftsmen, and in terms of their planning structure, large size and convenience for trade, are the largest ones recorded on the territory of Transcaucasia.

See also 
 Shaki Caravanserai
 Small Caravanserai
 Garghabazar Caravanserai

References

Literature 
 

Monuments and memorials in Azerbaijan
Tourist attractions in Azerbaijan
Caravanserais in Azerbaijan